Low temperatures have very marked effects upon the magnetic properties of various substances.

Oxygen
Oxygen, long known to be slightly magnetic in the gaseous state, is powerfully attracted in the liquid condition by a magnet, and the same is true, though to a less extent, of liquid air, owing to the proportion of liquid oxygen it contains.

Carbon steel
A magnet of ordinary carbon steel has its magnetic moment temporarily increased by cooling, that is, after it has been brought to a permanent magnetic condition ( aged ). The effect of the first immersion of such a magnet in liquid air is a large diminution in its magnetic moment, which decreases still further when it is allowed to warm up to ordinary temperatures. A second cooling, however, increases the magnetic moment, which is again decreased by warming, and after a few repetitions of this cycle of cooling and heating the steel is brought into a condition such that its magnetic moment at the temperature of liquid air is greater by a constant percentage than it is at the ordinary temperature of the air. The increase of magnetic moment seems then to have reached a limit, because on further cooling to the temperature of liquid hydrogen hardly any further increase is observed. The percentage differs with the composition of the steel and with its physical condition. It is greater, for example, with a specimen tempered very soft than it is with another specimen of the same steel tempered glass hard.

Alloy steels
Aluminium steels show the same kind of phenomena as carbon ones, and the same may be said of chrome steels in the permanent condition, though the effect of the first cooling with them is a slight increase of magnetic moment. Nickel steels present some curious phenomena. When containing small percentages of nickel (e.g. 084 or 3-82), they behave under changes of temperature much like carbon steel. With a sample containing 7.65%, the phenomena after the permanent state had been reached were similar, but the first cooling produced a slight increase in magnetic moment. But steels containing 18-64 and 29% of nickel behaved very differently. The result of the first cooling was a reduction of the magnetic moment, to the extent of nearly 50% in the case of the former. Warming again brought about an increase, and the final condition was that at the barometric pressure of liquid air the magnetic moment was always less than at ordinary temperatures. This anomaly is all the more remarkable in that the behaviour of pure nickel is normal, as also appears to be generally the case with soft and hard iron. Silicon, tungsten and manganese steels are also substantially normal in their behaviour, although there are considerable differences in the magnitudes of the variations they display.

Iron
Low temperatures also affect the permeability of iron, i.e. the degree of magnetization it is capable of acquiring under the influence of a certain magnetic force. With fine Swedish iron, carefully annealed, the permeability is slightly. Hard iron, however, in the same circumstances suffers a large increase of permeability.

References

Magnetism
Temperature